West of Arizona is a 1925 American silent Western film directed by Tom Gibson and starring Pete Morrison, Betty Goodwin and Beth Darlington.

Partial cast
 Pete Morrison as Bud West
 Betty Goodwin as Bess Randolph
 Beth Darlington as Dance Hall Girl
 Lightning as Bud's Horse

References

Bibliography
 Langman, Larry. A Guide to Silent Westerns. Greenwood Publishing Group, 1992.

External links
 

1925 films
1925 Western (genre) films
American black-and-white films
Films directed by Tom Gibson
Vitagraph Studios films
Silent American Western (genre) films
1920s English-language films
1920s American films